The 1977 European Athletics Junior Championships was the fourth edition of the biennial athletics competition for European athletes aged under twenty. It was held in Donetsk, Ukrainian SSR, Soviet Union between 19 and 21 August.

Men's results

Women's results

Medal table

References

Results
European Junior Championships 1977. World Junior Athletics History. Retrieved on 2013-05-29.

European Athletics U20 Championships
International athletics competitions hosted by the Soviet Union
European Junior
Sport in Donetsk
1977 in Soviet sport
1977 in youth sport
International athletics competitions hosted by Ukraine